Qissa, meaning fable, could refer to:

 Bengali Kissa, a tradition of Bengali language oral story-telling
 Punjabi Qisse, a tradition of Punjabi language oral story-telling
 Qissa (film), a 2013 Indian-German film in Punjabi by Anup Singh
 Qissa Khawani Bazaar, a bazaar in Peshawar, Pakistan
 Qissa-i Sanjan, an account of the early years of Zoroastrian settlers on the Indian subcontinent